This is a list of settlements in the Serres regional unit, Greece:

 Achinos
 Achladochori
 Adelfiko
 Agia Eleni
 Agia Paraskevi
 Agio Pnevma
 Agiochori
 Agios Christoforos
 Agios Dimitrios
 Agkistro
 Agriani
 Aidonochori
 Akritochori
 Alistrati
 Amfipoli
 Ammoudia
 Ampeli
 Anagennisi
 Anastasia
 Anatoli
 Angista
 Ano Kamila
 Ano Poroia
 Ano Vrontou
 Anthi
 Charopo
 Cheimarros
 Chionochori
 Chortero
 Choumniko
 Christos
 Chryso
 Chrysochorafa
 Dafni
 Dafnoudi
 Dasochori
 Dimitra
 Dimitritsi
 Domiros
 Draviskos
 Efkarpia
 Elaionas, Serres
 Emmanouil Papas
 Eptamyloi
 Flampouro
 Gazoros
 Gefyroudi
 Gonimo
 Iliokomi
 Irakleia
 Ivira
 Kala Dendra
 Kalochori
 Kalokastro
 Kamaroto
 Kapnofyto
 Karperi
 Kastanochori
 Kastanoussa
 Kato Kamila
 Kato Mitrousi
 Kato Poroia
 Kerkini
 Koimisi
 Konstantinato
 Kormista
 Koumaria
 Kouvouklio
 Krinida
 Lefkonas
 Lefkothea
 Lefkotopos
 Limnochori
 Lithotopos
 Livadia
 Livadochori
 Lygaria
 Makrinitsa
 Mandili
 Mandraki
 Mavrolofos
 Mavrothalassa
 Megalochori
 Melenikitsi
 Mesada
 Mesokomi
 Mesolakkia
 Mesorrachi
 Metalla, Serres
 Mikro Souli
 Mitrousi
 Monokklisia
 Monovrysi
 Myrkinos
 Myrini
 Nea Bafra
 Nea Kerdylia
 Nea Petra   
 Nea Tyroloi
 Nea Zichni
 Neo Petritsi
 Neo Souli
 Neochori Kerkinis
 Neochori Strymona
 Neos Skopos
 Nigrita
 Nikokleia
 Oinoussa
 Oreini
 Oreskeia
 Palaiokastro
 Palaiokomi
 Paralimni
 Pentapoli
 Peponia
 Pethelinos
 Platanakia
 Pontismeno
 Promachonas
 Proti
 Provatas
 Psychiko
 Rodolivos
 Rodopoli
 Serres
 Sfelinos
 Sidirokastro
 Sisamia
 Sitochori
 Skopia
 Skotoussa
 Skoutari
 Stathmos Angistis
 Stavrodromi
 Strymoniko
 Strymonochori
 Symvoli
 Terpni
 Theodorio
 Therma
 Tholos
 Toumpa
 Tragilos
 Triada
 Triantafyllia
 Valtero
 Valtotopi
 Vamvakia
 Vamvakofyto
 Vamvakoussa
 Variko
 Vergi
 Vyroneia
 Zervochori
 Zevgolatio

By municipality

See also

List of towns and villages in Greece

 
Lists of populated places in Greece